Murari Gupta (fl. 16th century) was born in a Baidya family in Sylhet. He was a physician and noted Bengali Vaishnava poet. He became a devotee of Chaitanya Mahaprabhu and moved to Nabadwip.

In 1513, he composed in Sanskrit the Shri Krishna Chaitanya Charanamrita (  murāri-gupta-kaṛchā), a poetic biography of Chaitanya Mahaprabhu. This work is the earliest source for Chaitanya's life. Later hagiographies are based on this work such as the Chaitanya Charitamrita.

External links
 

Bengali-language poets
Bengali Hindus
Bengali-language writers
16th-century Bengalis
Bengali male poets
Year of death unknown
Year of birth unknown
16th-century Indian poets
Indian male poets
People from Sylhet Division